Wesley David de Oliveira Andrade (born 13 March 2000), known as Wesley Gasolina or simply Wesley, is a Brazilian professional footballer who plays as right-back for Brazilian club Cruzeiro.

Club career

Hellas Verona 
On 2 September 2019, Wesley joined Serie A club Hellas Verona on a free transfer, after his contract with Flamengo had expired in April. He made only one appearance with the Primavera (under-19s) team.

Juventus 
Wesley moved to Juventus on 30 January 2020. He played for their reserve team – Juventus U23 – in the Serie C, and made his debut during the 2019–20 season on 2 February 2020, in a 0–0 draw to Pontedera. Wesley also helped Juventus U23 win the Coppa Italia Serie C, coming on as a substitute in the final against Ternana on 27 June 2020, which his side won 2–1.

Wesley was first called up for Juventus on 12 February 2020, in a Coppa Italia semi-final game against AC Milan. On 13 January 2021, Wesley started his first game for Juventus in the Coppa Italia, beating Genoa 3–2 after extra time.

Loans to Sion 
On 1 February 2021, Wesley was sent on loan to Swiss Super League side Sion until the end of the season. He made his debut on 3 February, in a 3–2 win against St. Gallen. Wesley scored his first professional goal four days later, helping his side draw 2–2 to Basel.

The loan was renewed for a further season on 31 August 2021.

Cruzeiro 
On 8 August 2022, Wesley signed for Cruzeiro in the Brazilian Série B on a permanent deal. He helped his side finish the 2022 season in first place, thus gaining promotion to the Série A.

International career 
Wesley represented Brazil at under-15 level at the 2015 South American U-15 Championship, helping his side win the tournament. He also played for Brazil at under-17 level at the 2017 South American U-17 Championship, playing eight games, and helping Brazil win the tournament. He also played seven games at the 2017 FIFA U-17 World Cup, scoring a goal against England in the semi-finals; Brazil finished the tournament in third place.

Style of play 
Nicknamed "" (Portuguese for "gasoline") for his pace, Wesley is a quick and dynamic attacking-minded right-back. He is also known for his dribbling and crossing abilities. Wesley has been likened to fellow Brazilian right-back Dani Alves for his characteristics.

Career statistics

Club

Honours 
Juventus U23
 Coppa Italia Serie C: 2019–20

Juventus
 Coppa Italia: 2020–21

Cruzeiro
 Campeonato Brasileiro Série B: 2022

Brazil U15
 South American U-15 Championship: 2015

Brazil U17
 South American U-17 Championship: 2017
 FIFA U-17 World Cup third place: 2017

References

External links
 
 David Wesley at Lega Serie A

2000 births
Living people
Sportspeople from Bahia
Brazilian footballers
Association football fullbacks
CR Flamengo footballers
Hellas Verona F.C. players
Juventus F.C. players
Juventus Next Gen players
Cruzeiro Esporte Clube players
FC Sion players
Serie C players
Campeonato Brasileiro Série B players
Swiss Super League players
Brazil youth international footballers
Brazilian expatriate footballers
Brazilian expatriate sportspeople in Italy
Brazilian expatriate sportspeople in Switzerland
Expatriate footballers in Italy
Expatriate footballers in Switzerland